Bolting may refer to:
Bolting (horse), which can describe either of two different types of behaviour in horses
Bolting (horticulture), a growth behaviour in plants

See also
Bolt (disambiguation)